Marynin may refer to the following places:
Marynin, Kuyavian-Pomeranian Voivodeship (north-central Poland)
Marynin, Gmina Siedliszcze in Lublin Voivodeship (east Poland)
Marynin, Gmina Rejowiec in Lublin Voivodeship (east Poland)
Marynin, Lublin County in Lublin Voivodeship (east Poland)
Marynin, Łódź Voivodeship (central Poland)
Marynin, Radzyń Podlaski County in Lublin Voivodeship (east Poland)
Marynin, Grodzisk Mazowiecki County in Masovian Voivodeship (east-central Poland)
Marynin, Grójec County in Masovian Voivodeship (east-central Poland)